Gas grips may refer to: 

 Pipe wrench
 Tongue-and-groove pliers
 Monkey wrench